Coley's toxins (also called Coley's toxin, Coley's vaccine, Coley vaccine, Coley's fluid or mixed bacterial vaccine) is a mixture containing toxins filtered from killed bacteria of species Streptococcus pyogenes and Serratia marcescens, named after William Coley, a surgical oncologist at the Hospital for Special Surgery who developed the mixture in the late 19th century as a treatment for cancer.

Their use in the late nineteenth and early 20th centuries represented a precursor to modern immunotherapy, although at that time their mechanism of action was not completely understood. 
Many important aspects of the mechanisms of action, such as that involving T-cells and NK cells, have been more recently identified. 

The FDA-approved BCG for non-muscle invasive bladder cancer is a highly related strategy of Coley's Toxin.

History 
Bacterial immunotherapy for the treatment of cancer has been utilized throughout history, with the earliest cases going back to c 2600 BC. Egyptian physician Imhotep treated tumors by a poultice, followed by incision, to facilitate the development of infection in the desired location and cause regression of the tumors.  In 13th century,  St. Peregrine experienced  spontaneous regression of tumor, after the tumor became infected. In the 18th and 19th centuries, deliberate infection of tumors was a standard treatment, whereby surgical wounds were left open to facilitate the development of infection. Throughout the time period, physicians reported successful treatment of cancer by exposing the tumor to infection including the report of French physician Dussosoy who covered an ulcerated breast carcinoma with gangrenous discharge soaked cloth, resulting in disappearance of tumor. Observations of a relationship between infection and cancer regression date back to at least the 18th century. More specifically, observations of an apparent relationship between erysipelas and remission of cancer predate Coley. For example, Anton Chekhov, in his capacity as a physician, recorded such a relationship in 1884.

Coley started his investigations after the death of one of his first patients, Elizabeth Dashiell, from sarcoma. Dashiell was a close childhood friend of John D. Rockefeller, Jr., who later indicated that her death was what first motivated his subsequent funding of cancer research.

Frustrated by this case, Coley's subsequent research led him to announce evidence of the apparent relationship between infection and cancer regression, which he published in 1891. His initial attempts at deliberate infection were mixed, but in 1893 he began combining Streptococcus pyogenes and Serratia marcescens, based upon research from G.H. Roger indicating that this combination led to greater virulence.

Coley published the results of his work as a case series, making it difficult to interpret them with confidence. According to the American Cancer Society, "more research would be needed to determine what benefit, if any, this therapy might have for people with cancer".

The so-called Coley's toxins were used against different types of cancer from the year 1893 through the year 1963. Within the preparation's first decade, it was changed from an unfiltered mixture of killed bacteria to a porcelain-filtered mixture, which reduced the adverse effect profile. From 1923 on, Parke-Davis was the only commercial source of Coley's toxins in the United States. Hall (1997) explains that the versions used by Coley himself were custom-compounded, although the formula for the preparation was never standardized. 

In the wake of the thalidomide controversy and the Kefauver Harris Amendment of 1962, Coley's toxins were assigned "new drug" status by the Food and Drug Administration (FDA), making it illegal to prescribe them outside of clinical trials. Since then, several small clinical trials have been conducted with mixed results.

Coley's toxins were also produced by the small German pharmaceutical company Südmedica and sold under the trade name Vaccineurin. However, production ceased by 1990 because of a lack of re-approval by German Federal Institute for Drugs and Medical Devices.

Rationale 
There are multiple rationales proposed for how Coley's toxins affect the patient.

Macrophages 
One rationale argues that macrophages are either in "repair mode", furthering the growing of cancer, or in "defense mode", destroying cancer. However, macrophages are in "defense mode" only if there is some recognized enemy. As cancer tissue is not recognized as enemy (but as normal body tissue), there is a need to bring more macrophages into "defense mode" by simulating an infection. The simulated infection results in a real fever. Unlike hyperthermia, real fever not only means heating of the body but also higher activity of the immune system. Thus, fever is seen as a precondition for a therapy using Coley's Toxins to succeed.

Tumor necrosis factor and interleukin 
One of the agents in Coley's Toxin that is thought to be biologically active is a lipopolysaccharide which causes fever.  The resulting fever from the lipopolysaccharide is thought to increase lymphocyte activity and boosts tumor necrosis factor (TNF). Tsung and Norton in Surgical Oncology reported that the active agent was thought to be interleukin-12, rather than TNF.

Streptokinase 
Another hypothesis argues that streptokinase (produced by killed bacteria of species Streptococcus pyogenes together with plasminogen from the patient) is the active agent of Coley's toxins. This hypothesis is supported by the fact that streptokinase has been associated with successful treatment of thromboangiitis obliterans.

Anti-angiogenesis 
In addition to the mechanisms above, Coley's toxins might be antiangiogenic – suppressing the formation of new blood vessels which are vital to the growth of tumors. However, angiogenesis is not a biochemical cause by itself but needs external triggers.

Dendritic cells 
A robust fever, which occurs in response to Coley fluid, generates inflammatory factors with co-stimulatory activity, which activate resting dendritic cells (DC), leading to the activation of anergic T cells, possibly accomplished through a second process, where physical damage to cancer cells leads to a sudden supply of cancer antigens to the dendritic cell population.

PAMP 
Recently (2008), an immunological explanation binding together immunological data with findings about spontaneous regression and epidemiological data indicating a lowered risk to develop cancer later after common infections, has been published. According to this hypothesis, pathogenic substances produced by bacteria, viruses, infectious fungi and other pathogens, but not human tissue, called 'pathogen associated molecular pattern' (PAMP) lead to activation and maturation of tumor-antigen loaded dendritic cells.  One PAMP thought to play a major role is the unmethlyated CpG motif found in bacterial DNA.  The CpG motif is recognized by toll-like receptor 9 (TLR9) and can induce a strong TH1 response.

Availability 
MBVax Bioscience, a Canadian Biotech company,  produces Coley Fluid for research and clinical study.  A private biotech company, Coley Pharmaceutical Group, has conducted clinical trials using genetic sequences which may have contributed to Coley's toxin's effectiveness, and was acquired by Pfizer in January 2008. In addition, the Waisbren Clinic in Wisconsin reports they have used Coley's toxin to treat patients since 1972. Coley's toxins are generally not available where approval or licence is required (in particular in the United States and Germany).

Drug makers including Pfizer and Sanofi-Aventis are interested in modern versions of Coley's toxins; Pfizer has acquired the Coley Pharmaceutical Group, set up in 1997

Germany 
Some specialized medical doctors in Germany apply Coley's toxins to patients. They can do so legally because, in Germany, unapproved medications may be produced, although they may not be sold or given away. Physicians can go to special laboratories and produce Coley's toxins there using their own hands. Coley's toxins may still be applied by a licensed medical doctor, because in Germany there is "Therapiefreiheit" ("therapy freedom"), the legal right to apply whichever therapy a physician considers to be appropriate in the light of their medical knowledge. For example, Dr  Josef Issels used several unconventional and controversial treatments, including Coley's toxins, for cancer patients in the second half of the 20th century.

This kind of therapy is offered as "Fiebertherapie" (fever therapy) or better "Aktive Fiebertherapie" (active fever therapy). This term was introduced by E. Göhring in 1985. Hyperthermia therapy or thermotherapy is not the same type of treatment, although sometimes incorrectly called "fever therapy".

Professional politics 

According to an article in the Iowa Orthopedic Journal, Coley's toxins were opposed by the medical establishment despite his reports of good results, because his reports were not believed to be credible. Hall (1997)  extensively explores the issue; one of the lenses through which Hall explores it is the decades-long, complicated relationship of James Ewing and William Coley as colleagues at the same institution. Hall explains that the aspects of Coley's work that were scientifically underpowered—the anecdotal emphasis, the lack of a standardized formula for the toxins preparations, the lack of methodologically rigorous clinical trials, and (relatedly) the problem of poor replicability—led many scientists to dismiss all use of Coley's toxins as mere hogwash. Although the truth was more complex than that dismissal recognized, it is a fact that the toxins never made it to the stage of a safe and effective medication, and today their use as alternative medicine is clearly flawed for the same reason that malariotherapy as alternative medicine is flawed, given what humanity now knows about molecular biology that was not known when these older therapies were tried: Even if certain kinds of immune challenge or immunomodulation can produce desirable immunotherapeutic effects, these crude methods of inducing such challenge or modulation are not specific enough (not targeted enough), present too many harms, and do not work consistently enough to bring benefits to most patients, being dependent on idiotypic molecular factors (which were not understood at all when the therapies were first developed and which even today are still not easy for immunotherapy designers to deal with).

See also 
Immunotherapy
Cancer immunotherapy
Cancer vaccine

References

External links

Hospitals 
 Hospital for Special Surgery, William B. Coley, Surgeon-in-Chief, 1925-1933

Companies 
 MBVax Bioscience Inc
 Coley Pharmaceutical Group

Scientific reviews 
 Coley toxins, from the American Cancer Society

Bacteriology
Alternative cancer treatments